This is a list of supermarket chains in Monaco.

 Carrefour
 Casino Supermarché
 Intermarché Express
 Marché U (Système U)
 Picard Surgelés
 Spar

Defunct brands

 Rotana 
 Écomarché
 Zall 
 Kosmin
 Zerbas
 Galaxias 
Tom
Economy (closed of 2008, shops later Closed the 2014 Market In )

References

Economy of Monaco-related lists
Monaco
Supermarket chains